Acacia auronitens is a shrub belonging to the genus Acacia and the subgenus Phyllodineae endemic to Western Australia.

Description
The pubescent to hirsute branchlets have slender  stipules. The ascending to erect, rigid green phyllodes are straight to recurved and have a narrowly oblong shape. It blooms from September to December and produces yellow flowers. The simple inflorescences simple are located singly on each axil. The spherical flower-heads contain 15 to 25 golden flowers. After flowering woody yellow seed podd form that have a narrowly oblong shape.

Taxonomy
The species was first formally described by the botanist John Lindley in 1839 as part of the work A Sketch of the Vegetation of the Swan River Colony. It was reclassified as Racosperma auronitens in 2003 then transferred back into the genus Acacia in 2006. The other synonyms is Acacia aureonitens.

The species has two recognised varieties:
 A. auronitens var. auronitens
 A. auronitens var. mollis

Distribution
It is native to an area in the Wheatbelt and the  Mid West regions of Western Australia between Eneabba, Mingenew and Perth where it is found growing on snaplains and hill slopes growing in gravelly lateritic sandy soils as a part of shrub or heathland communities.

See also
 List of Acacia species

References

External links

auronitens
Acacias of Western Australia
Plants described in 1839
Taxa named by John Lindley